A Deeper Understanding is the fourth studio album by American indie rock band The War on Drugs. It was released on August 25, 2017, through Atlantic Records.  The album was mixed by engineer Shawn Everett. The album won Best Rock Album at the 60th Annual Grammy Awards.

Reception

A Deeper Understanding received acclaim from music critics. At Metacritic, which assigns a normalized rating out of 100 to reviews from mainstream critics, the album received an average score of 81, based on 33 reviews, indicating universal acclaim. According to Marcy Donelson of AllMusic, A Deeper Understanding "reclaims and explores the distinctive soundscapes, vastness, and haunted psyche of Lost in the Dream, and that in itself is significant." On the same site, in a readers' poll by users it was ranked as the #1 album of 2017. Mark Richardson of Pitchfork noted similarities with mid-'80s rock, stating it is "also a fascinating study in influence; it’s hard to think of a band with more obvious touchstones that also sounds so original." Michael Bonner of Uncut Magazine described it as "some of the richest, most compelling and least lonely-sounding music of Granduciel’s career".

In a less enthusiastic review for Slant Magazine, Josh Goller noted "the album's lyrics, however, can’t match this same level of musical precision, and Granduciel too often repeats the same vague sentiments using threadbare imagery." The album's title was influenced by Kate Bush's song with the same name.

It was nominated for International Album of the Year at the 2018 UK Americana Awards.

At the 60th Annual Grammy Awards, A Deeper Understanding won the Grammy Award for Best Rock Album.

Accolades

Track listing
All words by Adam Granduciel. All music by Granduciel, except where noted.

Personnel
The War on Drugs

 Robbie Bennett – Prophet 12 , piano , celeste , backing vocals , Hammond Organ , Rhodes , Baldwin Organ 
 Adam Granduciel – vocals , LinnDrum , samplers , Yamaha CS-5 , piano , electric guitars , Wurlitzer , Mellotron , Hammond Organ , E70 Organ , Nashville guitars , acoustic guitars , lead electric guitars , vibes , celeste , Juno 106 , synthesizers , bass guitar , Korg Trident , harmonica , percussion , Arp Solina , Prophet 5 , PolyKorg , drums , Vox Jaguar , Roland Juno-60 , organ , tape loops , Vox Organ 
 Charlie Hall – drums , percussion , backing vocals , electric guitar , vibes 
 Dave Hartley – bass guitar , glockenspiel , acoustic guitar , backing vocals , fretless bass , Höfner bass 
 Anthony LaMarca – electric guitar , slide guitar , backing vocals , drums , acoustic guitar  
 Jon Natchez – baritone saxophone 

Additional musicians 
 Patrick Berkery – drums , percussion 
 Michael Bloch – electric rhythm guitar , electric guitar 
 Meg Duffy – slide guitar 
 Max Hart – Prophet 6 , Oberheim Expander , pedal steel 
 Otto Hauser – drums, percussion 
 Darren Jesse – drums, percussion 
 Michael Johnson – Arp Odyssey 
 Josh Kauffman – amplified voice , electric guitar 
 Parker Kindred – percussion 
 Sterling Laws – drums, percussion 
 Lucius (Jess Wolfe and Holly Laessig) – backing vocals  
 Carter Tanton – acoustic guitar 
 The Dove & The Wolf (Louise Hayat & Paloma Gil) – backing vocals 

Technical
 Adam Granduciel – production, recording
 Shawn Everett – recording, mixing
 Nick Krill, Daniel Schlett, Nicolas Vernhes, Gabe Cox Wax and Jeff Zeigler – additional recording
 Greg Calbi – mastering at Sterling Sound Studios

Artwork and design
 Adam Granduciel – art direction
 Rob Carmichael – art direction, design
 Shawn Brackbill – center booklet photograph 
 Dusdin Condren – photography

Charts

Weekly charts

Year-end charts

Certifications

References

2017 albums
The War on Drugs (band) albums
Albums produced by Adam Granduciel
Atlantic Records albums
Grammy Award for Best Rock Album
Albums recorded at Electro-Vox Recording Studios